Miss International Malaysia is a beauty pageant based in Malaysia that sends the winner to the annual Miss International pageant. The pageant was conceived in 1960 and considered as the oldest international beauty pageant in Malaysia. The winner of Miss International Malaysia will represents her country at the Miss International pageant. On occasion, when the winner does not qualify (due to age) for either contest, a runner-up is sent.  

The reigning Miss International Malaysia is Giselle Tay of Kuala Lumpur who was crowned on 13 March 2022 at Sabah Oriental Hotel in Kota Kinabalu. She represented Malaysia at the 60th Miss International pageant.

Requirements 

 Must be a Malaysian female citizen
 Single, never been married or divorce or have had children
 18 and under 28 years old
 Able to communicate well in English and Bahasa Malaysia
 Able to personify all the values and attributes of being a Miss International Malaysia

Titleholders

Past Franchises

Miss Supranational

Miss Intercontinental

Miss Tourism Queen International

Miss Tourism Intercontinental

Miss Global Beauty Queen

The Miss Globe

World Miss University

Miss Global International

List of Runners-up

Trivia

Franchise Holders 

 Shaw Organisation (1960–1970)
 Far East Beauty Congress
Exclusive Resources Marketing Malaysia Pte. Ltd. (2010–2016)

Name Changes 

 Miss Malaya International (1960–1962)
 Miss Malaysia International (1963–2004, 2017)
 Miss Global International Malaysia (2005–2015)
Miss Global Intercontinental Malaysia (2016)
 Miss International Malaysia (2018–present)

See also 
 Miss International

References

External links 

Miss International
Beauty pageants in Malaysia